Adrienne Monnier (26 April 1892 – 19 June 1955) was a French bookseller, writer, and publisher, and an influential figure in the modernist writing scene in Paris in the 1920s and 1930s.

Formative years 
Monnier was born in Paris on 26 April 1892. Her father, Clovis Monnier (1859–1944), was a postal worker (postier ambulant), sorting mail in transit on night trains. Her mother, Philiberte (née Sollier, 1873–1944), was "open-minded" with an interest in literature and the arts. Adrienne's younger sister, Marie (1894–1976), would become known as a skillful embroiderer and illustrator. Their mother encouraged the sisters to read widely from an early age and frequently took them to the theatre, opera, and ballet.

In 1909, aged 17, Monnier graduated from high school, with a teaching qualification (brevet supérieur). Within months, in September, she moved to London, officially to improve her English but in reality to be close to her classmate, Suzanne Bonnierre, with whom she was "very much in love". Monnier spent three months working as an au pair, before finding a job for six months teaching French in Eastbourne. She later wrote about her English experiences in Souvenirs de Londres ("Memories of London").

Back in France, Monnier taught briefly at a private school, before enrolling on a shorthand and typing course. Thus equipped, in 1912, she found work as a secretary at the Université des Annales, a Right Bank publishing house specialising in mainstream literary and cultural works. Although Monnier enjoyed the work, she had little in common with the writers and journalists with whom she came into contact, preferring the bohemian Left Bank and the avant-garde literary world that it represented.

In November 1913, Monnier's father, Clovis, was seriously injured in a train crash while at work; he was left with a lifelong limp. When the compensation came through, he gave all of it – 10,000 Francs – to Monnier, to help her set up in bookselling.

La Maison des Amis des Livres

On 15 November 1915, Monnier opened her bookshop and lending library, "La Maison des Amis des Livres" at 7 rue de l'Odéon, Paris VI. She was among the first women in France to found her own bookstore.  While women sometimes assisted in a family bookstore, and widows occasionally took over their husband's bookselling or publishing business, it was unusual for a French woman to independently set herself up as a bookseller. Nonetheless Monnier, who had worked as a teacher and as a literary secretary, loved the world of literature and was determined to make bookselling her career. With limited capital she opened her shop at a time when there was a genuine need for a new bookstore, since many booksellers had left their work to join the armed forces. As her reputation spread, Monnier's advice was sought out by other women who hoped to follow her example and become booksellers.

Odéonia 

Monnier offered advice and encouragement to Sylvia Beach when Beach founded an English language bookstore called Shakespeare and Company in 1919. During the 1920s, the shops owned by Beach and Monnier were located across from each other on the rue de l'Odéon in the heart of the Latin Quarter. Both bookstores became gathering places for French, British, and American writers. By sponsoring readings and encouraging informal conversations among authors and readers, the two women brought to bookselling a domesticity and hospitality that encouraged friendship as well as cultural exchange.

Le Navire d'Argent

In June 1925, Monnier, with Beach's moral and literary support, launched a French language review, Le Navire d'Argent (The Silver Ship), with Jean Prévost as literary editor. Taking its name from the silver sailing ship, which appears in Paris's coat of arms, it cost 5 Fr per issue, or 50 Fr for a twelve-month subscription. Although financially unsuccessful, it was an important part of the literary scene of the Twenties and was "a great European light", helping launch several writers' careers. Typically, about a hundred pages per issue, it was "French in language, but international in spirit" and drew heavily on the circle of writers frequenting her shop. The first edition contained a French-language translation (prepared jointly by Monnier and Beach) of T. S. Eliot's poem, The Love Song of J. Alfred Prufrock (May 1925). Other issues included an early draft of part of James Joyce's Finnegans Wake (Oct 1925); and an abridged version of Antoine de Saint-Exupéry's novella, The Aviator, in the penultimate (April 1926) edition. One edition (March 1926) was devoted to American writers (including Walt Whitman, William Carlos Williams and E. E. Cummings). It also first introduced Ernest Hemingway in translation to French audiences. Monnier herself contributed under the pseudonym J-M Sollier, based on her mother's maiden name. After twelve issues, Monnier abandoned the Navire d’Argent, as the effort and the cost was more than she could manage. To cover her losses, Monnier auctioned her personal collection of 400 books, many inscribed to her by their authors. A decade later, Monnier launched a successor periodical, the Gazette des Amis des Livres, which ran from January 1938 until May 1940.

Later years 

Although Beach closed her store during the German Occupation, Monnier's remained open and continued to provide books and solace to Parisian readers.  For ten years after the war Monnier continued her work as an essayist, translator and bookseller.  Plagued by ill health, Monnier was diagnosed in September 1954 with Ménière's disease, a disorder of the inner ear which affects balance and hearing. She also suffered from delusions. On 19 June 1955, she committed suicide by taking an overdose of sleeping pills.

Works 
 Les Gazettes, Gallimard, Paris, 1960.
 La Figure, René Julliard, Paris, 1923.
 Les Vertus, René Julliard, Paris, 1926.
 Fableaux, René Julliard, Paris, 1932.
 Souvenirs de Londres, Mercure de France, Paris, 1957.
 Rue de l'Odéon, Albin Michel, Paris, 1960.

References

Notes

Sources

External links

1892 births
1955 deaths
Writers from Paris
Suicides by poison
Modernist women writers
French booksellers
French women poets
French LGBT poets
20th-century French poets
20th-century French women writers
1955 suicides
20th-century French LGBT people
People with Ménière's Disease